Paducah (“If you wanna, you can rhyme it with bazooka”) is a song written by Leo Robin and Harry Warren, originally performed by Carmen Miranda and Benny Goodman and His Orchestra. The song was part of the 1943 musical The Gang's All Here starring Alice Faye, James Ellison, and Carmen Miranda. The movie cemented Miranda's image as the lady with the big fruity hats.

References

External links
Benny Goodman and Carmen Miranda - Paducah on the Internet Archives

Songs with lyrics by Leo Robin
Songs with music by Harry Warren
Carmen Miranda songs
Benny Goodman songs
1943 songs